Travis Clack Henderson (June 24, 1836 – September 10, 1919) was a Texas legislator and farmer who served as a Democrat in the Texas Senate and Texas House of Representatives.

Background

Travis Clack Henderson was born on June 24, 1836 in Alabama to John Henry and Minerva Benard Henderson. He had 7 siblings. In 1857, he moved to Paris, Texas and became a farmer. In 1866, he married Martha "Mattie" Sue Thomas in Lamar County, Texas, with whom he had 7 children. She died in 1885. Henderson died September 10, 1919. 

Henderson served in the United States Civil War as a captain and staff officer in the 32nd dismounted Texas calvary.

Political career
Henderson served in the Texas House of Representatives and Texas Senate as a Democrat.

References

1836 births
1919 deaths
Texas House of Representatives